Rudolf Potsch (born May 15, 1937 in Brno, Czechoslovakia) is an ice hockey player who played for the Czechoslovak national team. He won a bronze medal at the 1964 Winter Olympics.

References

External links

1937 births
Czech ice hockey coaches
Czechoslovak ice hockey coaches
HC Kometa Brno players
Ice hockey players at the 1960 Winter Olympics
Ice hockey players at the 1964 Winter Olympics
Living people
Medalists at the 1964 Winter Olympics
Olympic bronze medalists for Czechoslovakia
Olympic ice hockey players of Czechoslovakia
Olympic medalists in ice hockey
Ice hockey people from Brno
Czech ice hockey defencemen
Czechoslovak ice hockey defencemen
Czechoslovak expatriate sportspeople in West Germany
Czechoslovak expatriate sportspeople in Germany
Czech expatriate sportspeople in Germany
Czechoslovak expatriate sportspeople in Yugoslavia
Czechoslovak expatriate ice hockey people
Czech expatriate ice hockey people
Expatriate ice hockey players in West Germany
Czech expatriate sportspeople in Slovakia